After Alexandria fell under Muslim control, it gradually lost its importance, since the newly created Empire was not dependent on Land, and with other ports nearby, like Damietta, and Palestinian Ports, but nevertheless the city includes several large and important mosques. after Napoleon came in, the city started to regain its power, over the nearby port of Rosetta. today the city is the second largest, in Egypt, and one of the main important Mediterranean Sea ports.

Rashidunids
Attarin mosque see Commons, 1057 A.D. (370–641 St. Athanasius church)

Abbasids
Mosque of Abdul Rahman Bin-Hormuz,

Fatimids
Sheikh Al-Qabari mosque, 11th century

Ayyubids

Mamluks

Mosque of Sidi Gaber
Mosque of El-Nabi Daniel, 13th century
Al-Shatibi mosque
Al-Tartoushi mosque

Ottomans and Alawiyya Dynasty

El-Mursi Abul Abbas Mosque
Imam Albusiri mosque
Mosque of Sidi Yaqout Al-Arsh
Mosque of Sidi Bishr
Terbana mosque, 1684 ad.

Modern
Al Qa'ed Ibrahim Mosque

External links
https://web.archive.org/web/20101006210322/http://www.alex.eskindria.com/f138.html

References

https://web.archive.org/web/20110710201559/http://www.alex.eskindria.com/t3747.html
https://web.archive.org/web/20110609221651/http://www.alex.eskindria.com/t3743.html

 
Mosques
Alexandria
Mosques in Alexandria